Kowloon East was a geographical constituency in the election for the Legislative Council of Hong Kong in 1995, which elects one member of the Legislative Council using the first-past-the-post voting system. The constituency covers Kwun Tong District in Kowloon.

The constituency was merged into the Kowloon East constituency in 1998 after the handover of Hong Kong a year before.

Returned members
Elected members are as follows:

Election results

References 

Constituencies of Hong Kong
Kowloon
Constituencies of Hong Kong Legislative Council
1995 establishments in Hong Kong
Constituencies established in 1995